Ngqeleni is a town in OR Tambo District Municipality in the Eastern Cape province of South Africa.

Village in West Pondoland, 32 km southeast of Umtata and about 40 km north-north-west of Coffee Bay. The name is derived from the Xhosa ngqele, ‘cold’ or ‘frost’. Coldstream, which flows past it, may have a name translated from Ngqeleni, ‘at the cold’."

References

Populated places in the Nyandeni Local Municipality